Cynegirus or Cynaegirus  ( Kunégeiros or  Kunaígeiros; died 490 BC) was an ancient Greek general of Athens and had three siblings. His two brothers were the playwright Aeschylus and Ameinias, hero of the battle of Salamis, while his sister was Philopatho, the mother of the Athenian tragic poet Philokles. He was the son of Euphorion from Eleusis and member of the Eupatridae, the ancient nobility of Attica.

The Battle of Marathon 

In 490 BC, Cynegeirus and his brothers Aeschylus and Ameinias fought to defend Athens against Darius's invading Persian army at the Battle of Marathon. 
According to Plutarch, Cynegeirus was one of the Athenian Generals.

Despite their numerical superiority, the Persians were routed and fled to their ships. The Athenians pursued them, and Cynegeirus in his attempt to hold on the stern of a Persian ship with his bare hands had his hand cut off with an axe and died. 
According to another version of his death, recorded by the Roman historian Justin, when Cynaegyrus lost his right hand, he grasped the enemy's vessel with his left, but Persians cut off this hand too. Here the hero, having successively lost both his hands, hangs on by his teeth, and even in his mutilated state fought desperately with the last mentioned weapons, "like a rabid wild beast!"
The Suda encyclopedia writes that Cynaegirus held the ship with his right hand, when the hand was cut off, he held it with his left and when this hand was also cut he fell and died.

There was a custom in Athens that the father of the man who had the most valorous death in a battle should pronounce the funerary oration in public. The father of Cynaegeirus and the father of Callimachus had an argument about that. 
Polemon of Laodicea declaimed first on behalf of Cynaegeirus  and then on behalf of Callimachus.

The incident of the heroic death of Cynaegeirus became an emblem of cultural memory in ancient Greece and was described in literature in order to inspire patriotic feelings to future generations. It was also painted by the ancient Greek painter Polygnotus on the Stoa Poikile in Athens in 460 BC, while the ancient traveler and geographer Pausanias described the painting in his 2nd century AD work.

At Elefsina there is a monument dedicated to him.

References

5th-century BC Athenians
Battle of Marathon
Athenians of the Greco-Persian Wars
Ancient Greeks killed in battle
490 BC deaths